American Samoa Democratic Party is the American Samoa affiliate of the U.S. Democratic Party. It is based in the territorial capital of Pago Pago.

Party officials 
Election took place on October 22, 2020.

2020 Democratic presidential caucuses 
During the 2020 presidential caucuses for American Samoa, which took place on March 3, 2020, almost half of the votes (49.86%) went to candidate Mike Bloomberg, 29.34% to Tulsi Gabbard, 10.54% to Bernie Sanders, 8.83% to Joe Biden, and 1.42% to Elizabeth Warren.

Bloomberg dropped out of the race following the caucus, causing the party to reassess who would receive its support.

See also 
List of political parties in American Samoa
American Samoa Democrats

References

American Samoa
Politics of American Samoa
Political parties in insular areas of the United States